East Hampton North is a census-designated place (CDP) in Suffolk County, New York, United States. At the 2010 census, the population was 4,142.

Geography 
East Hampton North is located at  (40.971060, -72.188759).

Demographics 

As of the census of 2000, there were 3,587 people, 1,445 households, and 881 families residing in the CDP.  The population density was 643.1/mi2 (248.2/km2). There were 2,251 housing units at an average density of 403.6/mi2 (155.8/km2). The racial makeup of the CDP was 82.46% White, 7.39% African American, 0.08 Native American, 1.62% Asian, 0.08% Pacific Islander, 5.94% from other races, and 2.43% from two or more races. Hispanic or Latino of any race were 16.62% of the population.

There were 1,445 households, out of which 27.3% had children under the age of 18 living with them, 44.2% were married couples living together, 12.2% had a female householder with no husband present, and 39.0% were non-families. 31.9% of all households were made up of individuals, and 16.8% had someone living alone who was 65 years of age or older.  The average household size was 2.47 and the average family size was 3.07.

In the CDP, the population was spread out, with 22.3% under the age of 18, 6.7% from 18 to 24, 28.0% from 25 to 44, 25.8% from 45 to 64, and 17.2% who were 65 years of age or older. The median age was 41 years. For every 100 females, there were 92.6 males. For every 100 females age 18 and over, there were 90.2 males.

The median income for a household in the CDP was $45,347, and the median income for a family was $55,357. Males had a median income of $38,566 versus $29,750 for females. The per capita income for the CDP was $25,725.  About 10.3% of families and 12.2% of the population were below the poverty line, including 20.5% of those under the age of 18 and 4.2% of those ages 65 or older.

Schools 
 East Hampton Union Free School District

See also 
Freetown (East Hampton)

References

East Hampton (town), New York
Census-designated places in New York (state)
Census-designated places in Suffolk County, New York